was a powerful warlord in Tosa Province, Japan. He was the son of Chōsokabe Kanetsugu. His childhood name was Senyumaru (千熊丸).　

After his father Chōsokabe Kanetsugu was attacked by local lords and he killed himself in the Okō Castle in 1508, Kunichika was raised by the aristocrat Ichijō Fusaie in Tosa Province.　Kunichika gave his third son Kōsokabe Chikayasu for adoption to the Kōsokabe Clan in 1558. He reconciled with the Motoya clan and gathered strength. 

In 1560, at the Battle of Tonomoto, Chōsokabe Kunichika captured Nagahama castle from the Motoyama clan. In response to this, Motoyama Shigetoki departed Asakura castle with 2,500 men to take the castle back. Kunichika intercepted him with 1,000 troops near Nagahama castle. 
Kunichika won the Motoyama clan and died soon after, and was succeeded by his son, Chōsokabe Motochika.

Family
 Father: Chōsokabe Kanetsugu
 Wife: Osachi no Kata
 Children:
 Chōsokabe Motochika by Osachi no Kata
 Kira Chikasada (1541–1576)
 Motoyama no Kata married Motoyama Shigetoki
 Kōsokabe Chikayasu (1543–1593)
 Shima Chikamasu (d. 1571)
 daughter married Ike Yorikazu
 Oyo no Kata married Hakawa Kiyomune

References

Daimyo
Chōsokabe clan
1504 births
1560 deaths
People from Kōchi Prefecture